Hunting the Fairies is a 1949 comedy novel by the British writer Compton Mackenzie. It features some of the characters who had previously appeared in The Monarch of the Glen.

References

Bibliography
 David Joseph Dooley. Compton Mackenzie. Twayne Publishers, 1974.

1949 British novels
Novels by Compton Mackenzie
Novels set in Scotland
British comedy novels
Chatto & Windus books